Arthur Barclay (born April 29, 1982) is an American former collegiate basketball player and Democratic Party politician who has represented the 5th Legislative District in the New Jersey General Assembly since he was sworn into office on January 12, 2016. He resigned from office on June 18, 2018, after being charged with assault relating to domestic violence.

High school and collegiate basketball career
A native of Camden, Barclay graduated from Camden High School as part of the class of 2000. During his senior year, he was captain of the Camden Panthers basketball team that won the NJSIAA Tournament of Champions, defeating Seton Hall Preparatory School in the championship game by a score of 50–46; The  forward had 12 points and 14 rebounds in the win, with 27 points from teammate and future NBA player Dajuan Wagner. Barclay scored 1,259 points in his high school career and was recognized in 2013 by inclusion in the South Jersey Basketball Hall of Fame.

John Calipari recruited Wagner to the University of Memphis in June 2000, simultaneously agreeing to give Barclay a scholarship position on the team. Wagner had long insisted that he wanted to play together in college with Barclay and the two had been so close that it was often assumed that Wagner and Barclay were brothers.

Barclay played for three years on the Memphis Tigers men's basketball team, averaging 2.6 points per game in the 2001–02 season, 2.1 points a game in 2003–04 and 2.1 points per game in 2004–05. He graduated with a bachelor's degree in sociology from Memphis.

He has worked for the Camden County Department of Events and Community Outreach and been an assistant basketball coach at Camden High School.

Elected office
Barcaly lost a bid for election to an at-large seat on the Camden City Council in 2009 as part of a slate with Mayor Angel Cordero.

After Councilwoman Deborah Person-Polk decided against running for a second term of office, Barclay was selected by the Camden County Democratic Committee in April 2013 to replace Person-Polk and run for City Council in the Democratic primary under the official party line. After winning in the primary, Barclay was elected in the November 2013 general election and served on the Camden City Council from 2014 to 2016.

Barclay was chosen to fill one of the two Democratic Party ballot spots for the November 2015 general election after primary victor Holly Cass volunteered to step aside. His Assembly running mate, Patricia Egan Jones had been chosen to fill the Assembly seat and ballot position that had been held by Angel Fuentes until he resigned from office.

As a member of the General Assembly, Barclay has been appointed to serve on the Higher Education Committee and the Law and Public Safety Committee.

References

External links
Assemblyman Barclay's legislative web page, New Jersey Legislature
New Jersey Legislature financial disclosure forms
2015

1982 births
Living people
African-American state legislators in New Jersey
New Jersey city council members
Democratic Party members of the New Jersey General Assembly
Memphis Tigers men's basketball players
Politicians from Camden, New Jersey
Camden High School (New Jersey) alumni
21st-century American politicians
American men's basketball players
Forwards (basketball)
21st-century African-American politicians
20th-century African-American people